

A

 Acipenser
 †Adocus
 †Aletridelphys
 †Aletridelphys florencae
  †Alphadon
 †Alphadon marshi
 †Altacreodus
 †Altacreodus magnus
 †Amersinia
 †Amersinia FU082 – informal
 †Amersinia FU82 – informal
 †Amesoneuron
 †Amesoneuron FU037 – informal
 †Amesoneuron FU37 – informal
 †Ampelopsis
 †Ampelopsis acerifolia
 †Anomia
 †Anomia gryphorhyncha
  †Anzu
 †Anzu wyliei
 †Araliaephyllum
 †Araliaephyllum polevoi
  †Archelon
 †Artocarpus
 †Artocarpus lessigiana
 †Asimina
 †Asimina knowltonia
 Aspideretes
  Atractosteus
 †Avisaurus – or unidentified comparable form
 †Avisaurus archibaldi
 †Axestemys
 †Axestemys splendida
 Azolla
 †Azolla gigantea – type locality for species

B

 †Basilemys
 †Basilemys sinuosa
 †Belonostomus
 †Belonostomus longirostris
 †Bisonia
 †Bisonia niemii
  †Borealosuchus
 †Borealosuchus sternbergii
 †Boremys
 †Brachychampsa
 †Brachychampsa montana

C

 Campeloma
 †Campeloma acroterion
  Carcharias
 †Carpites
 †Carpites ulmiformis
 †Carpites verrucosus
 †Cedrobaena
 †Cedrobaena brinkman
 †Cedrobaena putorius
 †Celastrus
 †Celastrus taurenensis
  †Ceratophyllum
 †Ceratophyllum FU080 – informal
 †Cercidiphyllales
 †Cercidiphyllales HC355 – informal
 Cercidiphyllum
 †Cercidiphyllum ellipticum
 †Cercidiphyllum genetrix
 †Cercidiphyllum HC124 – informal
  †Champsosaurus
 †Champsosaurus laramiensis
 †Cimolodon
 †Cimolodon nitidus
 Cinnamomum
 †Cinnamomum lineafolia
 †Cissites
 †Cissites acerifolia
 †Cissites insignis
 †Cissites lobata
 †Cissites puilosokensis
 †Clisocolus
 †Clisocolus moreauensis
 †Cocculus
 †Cocculus flabella
 †Compsemys – type locality for genus
 †Compsemys victa – type locality for species
 †Corbulamella
 †Corbulamella inornata
 †Coriops
 †Coriops amnicolus – or unidentified comparable form
 †Cornophyllum
 †Cornophyllum newberryi
  Cornus – or unidentified related form
 †Crassatellina
 †Crassatellina hollandi
  Crassostrea
 †Crenella
 †Crenella elegantula
 †Cretalamna 
 †Cretalamna feldmanni – type locality for species
  Cucullaea
 †Cucullaea nebrascensis
 †Cupressinocladus
 †Cupressinocladus interruptus
 †Cuspidaria
 †Cuspidaria ventricosa
 †Cyclurus
 †Cyclurus fragosus
 †Cymbophora
 †Cymbophora warrenana
 †Cypercites – report made of unidentified related form or using admittedly obsolete nomenclature

D

 †Dalbergites – or unidentified related form
 †Dalbergites simplex
 †Dammarites
 †Dammarites HC257 – informal
 †Dasyatis 
 †Dasyatis northdakotaensis – type locality for species
 Dicotylophyllum
 †Dicotylophyllum anomalum
   †Didelphodon
 †Didelphodon vorax
 †Dosiniopsis
 †Dosiniopsis deweyi
 †Dryophyllum
 †Dryophyllum subfalcatum
 †Dryophyllum tenneseensis
 †Dryophyllum tennesseensis
 †Dryophyllum tennessensis

E

 †Edmontosaurus
  †Edmontosaurus annectens
 †Elasmodus
 †Elatides
 †Elatides longifolia
 †Emarginachelys
 †Emarginachelys cretacea
  †Enchodus
 †Equisetum
 †Equisetum FU036 – informal
 †Equisetum FU36 – informal
 †Erlingdorfia
 †Erlingdorfia montana
 †Essonodon
 †Essonodon browni
 †Ethmocardium
 †Ethmocardium whitei

F

 Ficus
 †Ficus planicostata
 †Fokieniopsis
 †Fokieniopsis catenulata

G

 †Gamerabaena – type locality for genus
 †Gamerabaena sonsalla – type locality for species
 †Gilmoremys
 †Gilmoremys lancensis
  Ginkgo
 †Ginkgo adiantoides
 †Glasbius
 †Glasbius twitchelli
 Glyptostrobus
  †Glyptostrobus europaeus
 †Glyptostrobus HC9 – informal
 †Goniomya
 †Goniomya americana
 †Grammatodon
 †Grammatodon sulcatinus
 †Grewiopsis
 †Grewiopsis saportana
 †Gypsonictops
 †Gypsonictops illuminatus
 †Gyrostrea
 †Gyrostrea subtrigonalis

H

 †Habrosaurus
 †Habrosaurus dilatus
 †Harmsia
 †Harmsia hydrocotyloidea
 †Helopanoplia
 †Helopanoplia distincta
 †Hoplochelys
 †Hoplochelys clark – type locality for species
  †Hoploscaphites
 †Hoploscaphites nicolletii
 †Hummelichelys
 †Hummelichelys foveatus
  †Humulus
 †Humulus HC243 – informal
 †Hydropteris
 †Hydropteris pinnata
 †Hypoxytoma
 †Hypoxytoma nebrascana

I

  †Inoceramus – tentative report
 †Ischyodus
 †Ischyodus rayhaasi – type locality for species
 †Ischyrhiza
 †Ischyrhiza avonicola

J

 †Judithemys
 †Judithemys backmani
 Juglans – report made of unidentified related form or using admittedly obsolete nomenclature
 †Juglans arctica

L

  Lamna
 †Lamna mediavia
 †Laurophyllum
 †Laurophyllum lanceolatum
 †Laurophyllum wardiana
 †Leepierceia
 †Leepierceia preartocarpoides
 †Lemnaceae
 †Lemnaceae scutatum
  Lepisosteus
 †Lepisosteus occidentalis
 Limopsis
 †Limopsis striatopunctatus
 †Lioplacodes
 †Liriodendrites
 †Liriodendrites bradacii
  †Liriodendron – report made of unidentified related form or using admittedly obsolete nomenclature
 †Liriodendron laramiense
 †Lisserpeton
 †Lisserpeton bairdi – or unidentified comparable form
 †Lonchidion
 †Lonchidion selachos

M

 †Macclintockia – report made of unidentified related form or using admittedly obsolete nomenclature
 †Macclintockia electilis
 Malletia
 †Malletia evansi
  Marchantia
 †Marchantia pealii
 †Marmarthia
 †Marmarthia johnsonii
 †Marmarthia pearsonii
 †Marmarthia trivalis
 †Marmarthia trivialis
 †Melvius
 †Melvius thomasi
  †Meniscoessus
 †Meniscoessus robustus
 †Mesocyparis
 †Mesocyparis borealis
 †Mesodma
 †Mesodma thompsoni
  Metasequoia
 †Metasequoia HC035 – informal
 †Metasequoia HC35 – informal
 †Metasequoia occidentalis
 †Modiolus
 †Modiolus galpinianus
 †Myledaphus
 †Myledaphus bipartitus
 Myliobatis
 †Myliobatis foxhillsensis – type locality for species
 Myrica
 †Myrica torreyi

N

  †Nelumbo
 †Nelumbo FU062 – informal
 †Nelumbo FU085 – informal
 †Nelumbo FU62 – informal
 †Nelumbo HC202 – informal
 †Neurankylus
 †Nilsonia
 †Nilsonia yukonensis
 †Nilssoniocladus
 †Nilssoniocladus comtula
 †Nilssoniocladus yukonensis
 †Nordenskioldia
 †Nordenskioldia borealis
  Nucula
 †Nucula obsoletastriata
 †Nucula planomarginata
 Nuculana
 †Nuculana scitula
 †Nuculana tarensis
 †Nyssidium
 †Nyssidium arcticum

O

  Odontaspis
 †Odontaspis macrota
 †Ophiomorpha
 †Opisthotriton
 †Opisthotriton kayi
 †Osmunda
 †Osmunda hollicki

P

  †Pachycephalosaurus
 †Pachycephalosaurus wyomingensis
 †Palaeosaniwa
 †Palaeosaniwa canadensis
 †Palatobaena
 †Palatobaena cohen – type locality for species
 †Paleoaster
 †Paleoaster inquirenda
 †Paloreodoxites
 †Paloreodoxites plicatus
 Panopea
 †Panopea occidentalis
 †Paranymphaea
 †Paranymphaea crassifolia
 †Paranymphaea hastata
  †Paronychodon
 †Paronychodon lacustris
 Periploma
 †Periploma subgracile
 †Phelopteria
 †Phelopteria linguaeformis
  †Philodendron
 †Philodendron HC201 – informal
 Physa
 †Piceoerpeton
 †Pistia
 †Pistia corrugata
 †Platanites
 †Platanites marginata
 Platanus
 †Platanus raynoldsii
  †Platecarpus
 †Plesiobaena
 †Plesiobaena antiqua
 †Plesiobaena antiquus
  †Plioplatecarpus
 Populus
 †Populus nebrascensis
 †Protocardia
 †Protocardia subquadrata
 †Protochelydra
 †Pseudoptera
 †Pseudoptera subtortuosa
 †Pterospermites
 †Pterospermites cordata

Q

 †Quereuxia
 †Quereuxia angulata

R

 †Rhamnus
 †Rhamnus cleburni
 †Rhamnus salicifolius
  †Richardoestesia
 †Richardoestesia isosceles

S

 †Salvinia
 †Salvinia HC312 – informal
  †Saurornitholestes
 †Scapanorhynchus – tentative report
 †Scapherpeton
 †Scapherpeton tectum
 †Scaphites
 †Scaphites corvensis
 †Scaphites mariasensis
  †Sequoia
 †Sequoia HC070 – informal
 †Sequoia HC70 – informal
 †Sequoia obovata – or unidentified comparable form
 †Sourimis
 †Sourimis equilateralis
 Sphaerium
 †Squatirhina
 †Squatirhina americana
 †Syncyclonema
 †Syncyclonema halli

T

 †Tancredia
 †Tancredia americana
 Taxodium
 †Taxodium HC071 – informal
 †Taxodium olrikii
 †Tellinimera
 †Tellinimera scitula
  †Thescelosaurus
 †Thescelosaurus neglectus
 †Thoracosaurus
 †Thoracosaurus neocesariensis
 †Torosaurus
 †Torosaurus latus
 †Trachodon
  †Triceratops
 †Triceratops horridus
 †Triceratops prorsus
 †Trochodendroides
 †Trochodendroides nebrascensis
 †Troodon
  †Tyrannosaurus
 †Tyrannosaurus rex

V

 †Vetericardiella
 †Vetericardiella crenalirata
 Vitis
 †Vitis stantonii

Z

 †Zingiberopsis
 †Zingiberopsis attenuata
 †Zingiberopsis magnifolia
 Ziziphus
 †Ziziphus fibrillosus

References

Mesozoic
North Dakota